Gregory Brian Standridge (May 6, 1967 – November 16, 2017) was an American politician who served as a Republican member of the Arkansas State Senate for District 16, which includes Newton and Pope counties and parts of Boone, Carroll and Van Buren counties in the northern portion of his state.

Early life and education 
Standridge graduated from Russellville High School and earned a Bachelor of Business Administration degree in 1987 from Arkansas Tech University in Russellville.

Career 
Standridge won a low-turnout special runoff election held on February 10, 2015, to succeed fellow Republican Michael Lamoureux, who resigned in November 2014 to become chief of staff in the new state administration of Governor Asa Hutchinson. Standridge defeated fellow Republican Stan J. Berry, 2,675 votes (53.6 percent) to 2,313 (46.4 percent).

Though he was elected in mid-February, Standridge was not allowed to fill the vacant Senate seat until April 2015.

Personal life 
He and his wife, Karen Sue Flegel Standridge (born c. 1966), had four children. Standridge died of cancer at the age of 50.

References

1957 births
2017 deaths
Arkansas Tech University alumni
People from Russellville, Arkansas
Businesspeople from Arkansas
Insurance agents
County officials in Arkansas
American firefighters
Republican Party Arkansas state senators
Baptists from Arkansas
21st-century American politicians
Deaths from cancer in Arkansas
20th-century American businesspeople
20th-century Baptists